Agartala Book Fair (Bengali language: আগরতলা বইমেলা) is an annual book fair usually held in February in Agartala, Tripura, India.

History 
It was started on 20 March 1981. It ran for 10 days.

In 2017, Tripura Publishers' Guild Secretary Raghunath Sarkar says, "After New Delhi and Kolkata book fairs, Agartala book fair is the most popular book fair in India."

See also 
 Kolkata Book Fair

References 

Book_fairs_in_India
1981 establishments in Tripura
Annual events